Asha Black is a 2014 Indian thriller film and is the debut film from writer/director John Robinson. It was simultaneously shot in  Malayalam and Tamil as Nee Naan Nizhal.

Synopsis

Five people of Indian origin are killed in Kuala Lumpur, Malaysia, within a short period of time. At first, the attacks are believed to be racially motivated, but investigating officer Anwar Ali, a Tamilian of Indian origin, feels that there are no grounds for that claim.

He and his team find a common factor among the victims on Facebook: they all had a mutual friend called ‘Asha Black’. Asha is a 17-year-old girl addicted to making online friends and chatting with them 24/7.

When an online romance blooms between ‘Asha Black’ and Coimbatore-based young musician, Rohith, Rohith decides to go to Kuala Lumpur to meet her on her eighteenth birthday. With the help of a taxi driver, Senthilnathan, he reaches Asha's house, but unfortunately, she has committed suicide. Then it is revealed that Asha was a victim of sexual abuse through Facebook and she is addicted to it because her parents have no time to spend with their only daughter. Enraged, Rohit with the help of Senthilnathan kills Asha's tormentors and finally, he kills a security guard who sexually abused Asha when she was a young girl in school and this news was abandoned by her own parents to safeguard their reputation. Anwar tracks down Rohit with all evidence and arrests him, but silently praises Rohit's killings. The film ends with Anwar realising how parents' care and attention is important to children stopping them from getting addicted to bad habits and discusses with his daughter to how to spend their weekend.

Asha Black takes the viewer on a guided tour of the dark alleys of the World Wide Web, showing how the unmonitored use of the Internet by young adults can make them prey to predators who supply pornographic material and how neglected children become victims of sexual abuse.

Cast
Sarath Kumar as Anwar Ali, Assistant Superintendent of Police
Arjun Lal as Rohit
Ishitha Chauhan as Asha Srinivas (Asha Black)
Manoj K. Jayan as Senthil Nathan
Devan as Srinivas
Krishnabhaskar Mangalasserri as Police officer Ram
Anjali Aneesh Upasana
 Bhagath Manuel as Sidhu
 Black Pandi as Pandi
 Fathima Babu as Rohit's Mother
 Rizabawa as Rohit's Father
 Karthik Das as Rohit's Friend
Tamil version
M. S. Bhaskar as Thambiannan
 "Kadhal" Arun

Production
The team shot scenes in Kerala and Malaysia in September 2013, with debutant director John Robinson revealing that the plot would revolve around the dangers of social networks. Arjun Lal, previously seen as a child/teenage artiste in Thanmathra (2005), made a comeback in a leading role. Though he played just a supporting role, the film used Sarath Kumar's presence to market the film extensively in both languages. The Tamil version was initially titled Narumughai.

Soundtrack

The film's score and soundtrack are composed by Jecin George. Song lyrics were written by Din Nath Puthanchery and Jecin George. The audio release of the film was held on May 10, 2014.

Release

The Malayalam and Tamil versions opened simultaneously on 10 October 2014. A critic from The Hindu concluded, "It’s a weird love story and a crime thriller — and its big problem is that it can’t balance both".

References

External links 

2014 films
Films shot in Kerala
Films shot in Malaysia
2010s Tamil-language films
Indian multilingual films
2014 multilingual films
2010s Malayalam-language films